Kolhan division  is one of the five divisions in the Indian state of Jharkhand. The division comprises three districts: East Singhbhum, Seraikela Kharsawan district, and West Singhbhum. The three districts were earlier a part of South Chotanagpur division. The headquarters of the division is Chaibasa. It has a population of 4,861,313.

Languages

References

Divisions of Jharkhand